Diario Oficial (or Diário Oficial), a common Spanish and Portuguese designation for a government gazette, may refer to:
 Diário Oficial da União, Brazil
 Diario Oficial de la República de Chile
 Diario Oficial (Colombia)
 Diario Oficial (El Salvador)
 Diario Oficial de la Federación, Mexico
 Diario Oficial (Uruguay)

See also
 Official Journal (disambiguation)